Beginning in 2014, a number of people from various countries were beheaded by the Islamic State: a radical Sunni Islamist group operating in Iraq and parts of Syria.

In January 2014, a copy of an ISIS penal code surfaced describing the penalties it enforces in areas under its control, including multiple beheadings. Beheading videos have been frequently posted by ISIS members to social media. Several of the videoed beheadings were conducted by Mohammed Emwazi, whom the media referred to as "Jihadi John" ("John" because of his English accent) before his identification.

The beheadings received wide coverage around the world and attracted international condemnation. Political scientist Max Abrahms posited that ISIS may be using well-publicized beheadings as a means of differentiating itself from Al-Qaeda in Iraq (AQI), and identifying itself with Khalid Sheikh Mohammed, the al-Qaeda member who beheaded Daniel Pearl. The publicised beheadings represent a small proportion of a larger number of total people killed following capture by ISIS.

Background

ISIL's earlier incarnations 
According to Professor Ibrahim al-Marashi, ISIL's earlier incarnations used beheadings to force foreign policy changes such as getting the Philippines to withdraw from the Iraq War.

ISIL's justifications or reasons for beheadings 
Prior to the 2014–2015 wave of ISIL beheadings of Westerners and Japanese, ISIL members on 12 August 2014 sent an email to the family of American hostage James Foley and stated that American hostages would be killed in retaliation for:
 the 8 August 2014 U.S. bombings of ISIL;
 U.S. incarceration of Pakistani Muslimah Aafia Siddiqui;
 the U.S. and its government having "no motivation to deal with the Muslims except with the language of force."

According to Professor Ibrahim al-Marashi, ISIL is using beheadings of locals to intimidate people, including their own soldiers, into obeying the dictates of a weak state. Beheadings of Westerners are designed to strike back at the United Kingdom and the United States for military actions against ISIL that they have no other way of responding to. "With an act of a sword, they manage to force both [American President] Obama and [British Prime Minister] Cameron to react. The two men, who control the world's most advanced militaries, find themselves at the mercy of the sword. Both displayed physical pain and grief when they condemned the way their nationals died." says al-Marashi.

"Terror marketing" to recruit new fighters is another motivation.  "Some of these men have sort of a pornographic attraction to these violent scenes, these violent beheading videos. It really sort of energizes them." said Paul Cruickshank, a terrorism analyst for CNN.

List of incidents

Alleged beheading plots

Jihadi John
Sky News spoke to a defector member of Islamic State, who claimed he witnessed Mohammed Emwazi, known as Jihadi John, murder Japanese hostage Kenji Goto. He is the only person to admit seeing Emwazi kill. The Islamic State said Emwazi was employed as the chief killer of foreign hostages.

The Islamic State claimed foreign hostages captured and murdered by the group were subjected to numerous mock executions until the procedure became normal, which, it has been suggested, was why many hostages appeared calm in execution videos published online by the group. The Islamic State said the hostages were beheaded later.

2014 Australian counter-terrorism raids

 
In a pre-dawn police raid on September 18, 2014, Australian law enforcement detained 15 individuals in Sydney and Brisbane who were allegedly plotting a "demonstration execution". The purported plan was to kidnap a random resident of Sydney and behead the individual on camera, draped in the black flag of the Islamic State. The beheading did not occur.

Theresa May assassination plan
In November 2017, Naa'imur Zakariyah Rahman planned to detonate bombs and behead the then British prime minister Theresa May in the name of Islamic State. He was arrested before he could do so and convicted in 2018.

Beheading of a child in Mozambique

In March 2021, Save the Children, a UK-based aid group, reported the beheading of a 12 year old child by ISIL-linked militants.

International response
U.S. President Barack Obama condemned the actions of the militants and Jihadi John in particular and vowed punishment for all the militants responsible behind the videotaped beheadings. Secretary of State John Kerry also called Jihadi John a "coward behind a mask" and, echoing Obama, stated that all those responsible would be held accountable by the United States. British officials have also reiterated their commitment to capturing those responsible for the beheadings. Admiral Alan West, a former UK Security Minister, said that Jihadi John is a "dead man walking" who will be "hunted down like Osama Bin-Laden". British Prime Minister David Cameron also condemned the actions and stated that he was absolutely certain that Jihadi John would "one way or another, face justice". Other figures like Justice Secretary Chris Grayling, and Secretary General of Interpol Ronald Noble also stated that Jihadi John should be brought to justice.

The day after the video of the beheading of Steven Sotloff surfaced, Cameron told the House of Commons: "I am sure the whole House, and the whole country, will join with me in condemning the sickening and brutal murder of another American hostage, and share our shock and anger that it again appears to have been carried out by a British citizen. All our thoughts are with the British hostage and his family. Their ordeal is unimaginable." He concluded: "A country like ours will not be cowed by these barbaric killers. If they think we will weaken in the face of their threats, they are wrong. It will have the opposite effect. We will be more forthright in the defence of the values, liberty under the rule of law, freedom, democracy that we hold dear."

Soon after the David Haines video surfaced, Prime Minister Cameron released a statement by Twitter: "The murder of David Haines is an act of pure evil. My heart goes out to his family who have shown extraordinary courage and fortitude. We will do everything in our power to hunt down these murderers and ensure they face justice, however long it takes."

The White House released this statement via Twitter: "The United States strongly condemns the barbaric murder of UK citizen David Haines by the terrorist group ISIL [ISIS]. Our hearts go out to the family of Mr. Haines and to the people of the United Kingdom. The United States stands shoulder to shoulder tonight with our close friend and ally in grief and resolve. We will work with the United Kingdom and a broad coalition of nations from the region and around the world to bring the perpetrators of this outrageous act to justice, and to degrade and destroy this threat to the people of our countries, the region and the world."

The British Counter Terrorism Internet Referral Unit (CTIRU) has been working to "take extremist material off the internet" and has removed over 28,000 pieces of "unlawful terrorist-related content" between December 2013 and August 2014.

In response to the beheading of journalists James Foley and Steven Sotloff, Agence France-Presse (AFP) released a statement saying that it would "no longer accept work from freelance journalists who travel to places where we ourselves would not venture" including Syria. The Boston-based GlobalPost, for whom Foley had been a contributor, released a statement saying "While we continue to send staff correspondents to Syria, we no longer accept freelance work from that war zone."

Two days after the beheading of Hervé Gourdel, hundreds of Muslims gathered in the Grand Mosque of Paris to show solidarity against the beheading. The protest was led by the leader of the French Council of the Muslim Faith, Dalil Boubakeur, and was joined by thousands of other Muslims around the country. French president François Hollande said Gourdel’s beheading was "cowardly" and "cruel," and confirmed that airstrikes would continue against ISIL in Iraq. Hollande also called for three days of national mourning, with flags flown at half-mast throughout the country and said that security would be increased throughout Paris.

See also
 Killing of captives by ISIL
 Murders of Louisa Vesterager Jespersen and Maren Ueland

References

External links
 Photos: ISIS terrorists released info graphic shows its suicide attack statistics including types of attacks

 
Foreign hostages in Syria
Kidnappings by Islamists
2014 in Iraq
2014 in Syria
2015 in Iraq
2015 in Syria
2014 murders in Asia
2015 murders in Asia
Murder in Iraq
Murder in Syria
Filmed executions
Filmed executions in Iraq
Beheading videos
Filmed killings in Asia
Persecution by ISIL